Kairiru is one of three Kairiru languages spoken mainly on Kairiru and Mushu islands and in several coastal villages on the mainland between Cape Karawop and Cape Samein near Wewak in East Sepik Province of Papua New Guinea.

Morphology

Pronouns and person markers
One remarkable feature of the pronoun system of Kairiru is that it appears to have lost the distinction between first-person inclusive and exclusive pronouns throughout its affix paradigms, but then recreated inclusive forms in its independent pronouns by combining first-person and second-person forms along the lines of Tok Pisin  (<  + ). The inclusive-exclusive distinction is almost universal among Austronesian languages but generally lacking in Papuan languages.

Free pronouns

Genitive pronouns

Possessive suffixes on inalienable nouns

Subject prefixes on verbs

Object suffixes on verbs

References

 Wivell, Richard (1981). Kairiru grammar. M.A. thesis, University of Auckland.

External links
 Kairiru Grammar

Languages of Papua New Guinea
Schouten languages